47 Ronin is a 2013 American fantasy action film directed by Carl Rinsch in his directorial debut. Written by Chris Morgan and Hossein Amini from a story conceived by Morgan and Walter Hamada, the film is a work of Chūshingura ("The Treasury of Loyal Retainers"): a fictionalized account of the forty-seven rōnin, a real-life group of masterless samurai under daimyō Asano Naganori in 18th-century Japan who avenged Naganori's death by confronting his rival Kira Yoshinaka. Starring Keanu Reeves in the title role, Hiroyuki Sanada, Tadanobu Asano, Rinko Kikuchi and Ko Shibasaki, the film bears little resemblance to its historical basis compared to previous adaptations, and instead serves as a stylized interpretation set "in a world of witches and giants."

Produced by H2F Entertainment, Mid Atlantic Films, Moving Picture Company, Stuber Productions and Relativity Media, 47 Ronin premiered in Japan on December 6, 2013 before being released by Universal Pictures on December 25, 2013 in the United States in both 3D and 2D. While the action sequences and visuals were praised, 47 Ronin received generally negative reviews from critics and grossed just $151 million against its production budget of $175–225 million, making it one of the biggest box office bombs in history and leaving Universal in the red for 2013. Variety magazine listed 47 Ronin as one of "Hollywood's biggest box office bombs of 2013". Despite its critical and commercial failure, a sequel, Blade of the 47 Ronin, was released on October 25, 2022.

Plot

In late medieval Japan, a half-Japanese, half-English outcast named Kai is saved by the benevolent Lord Asano, ruler of the Akō Domain. Kai and Asano's daughter Mika fall in love, despite the scorn her father's samurai hold for Kai’s mixed ancestry.

Lord Kira, the Shōgun's master of ceremonies, seeks to take Akō for himself with the help of Mizuki, a shapeshifting kitsune. She sends a kirin to kill Asano and his men on a hunting trip, leading Kai to ride to their aid. Taking up a fallen sword, Kai slays the monster and spots Mizuki in the form of a white fox with different-colored eyes. When the Shōgun Tokugawa Tsunayoshi visits Akō, Kai notices Mizuki disguised as a concubine with the same multi-colored eyes. He tries to warn Asano's principal counselor, Oishi, about the witch in Kira's household, but is dismissed.

For the entertainment of the Shōgun, Kira arranges a duel between his best warrior, a golem, and Asano's chosen combatant, whom Mizuki incapacitates with magic. Kai secretly dons his armor to fight in his stead, but is unmasked during the duel, and the Shōgun orders him severely beaten. That night, Mizuki bewitches Asano into believing Kira is raping Mika, causing him to attack the unarmed lord. Sentenced to death, Asano is compelled to perform seppuku to preserve his honor. The Shōgun gives Kira domain over Akō and Mika, granting her one year of mourning before she must marry Kira. The Shōgun brands Oishi and his men ronin, forbidding them from avenging Asano, and Kira has Oishi imprisoned and Kai sold into slavery.

Nearly a year later, Oishi is released by his captors, believing him harmless. Having realized that Kira used sorcery to frame Asano, Oishi and his son Chikara reunite the scattered ronin, and rescue Kai from the fighting pits of the Dutch colony of Dejima. Kai leads them to the mystical Tengu Forest, which he escaped as a child, to obtain the special blades of the Tengu. Warning Oishi never to draw his sword inside the Tengu temple, Kai faces the Tengu Master who once trained him. Faced with an illusion of his men being slaughtered by the Tengu, Oishi resists the urge to draw his sword, while Kai bests his former master. Having proven themselves worthy, the ronin receive their blades.

They plan to ambush Kira on his pilgrimage to a shrine to seek blessings for his wedding to Mika, but the procession is a trap and most of the ronin are killed. Believing them all dead, Mizuki presents Kira with Oishi's sword, and taunts Mika with their deaths. Oishi and Kai, having survived the attack, lead half the remaining ronin to infiltrate Kira's castle, disguised as a band of wedding performers. With Kira's men distracted during the performance, the other ronin scale the castle walls and attack the guards. While Oishi fights Kira, Kai and Mika face Mizuki in the form of a dragon, and Kai finally draws on the mystical powers of the Tengu to kill her. Oishi emerges with Kira's severed head, and Kira's retainers surrender.

The ronin and Kai surrender themselves to the authorities of the bakufu and are sentenced to death, having violated the Shōgun's prohibition on avenging Asano. However, the Shōgun declares that they followed the principles of bushido and restores their honor as samurai, allowing them to perform seppuku and receive the honor of burial with Asano. The Shōgun returns domain of Akō to Mika, and pardons Chikara so that he may preserve Oishi’s bloodline and serve Akō.

An epilogue explains the tradition of paying respect at the graves of the 47 Ronin, which continues every year on December 14.

Cast

 Keanu Reeves as Kai, a half-Japanese, half-English outcast adopted by the household of Lord Asano who joins the Ronin. The character was created for the film.
 Daniel Barber as Teen Kai
 Hiroyuki Sanada as Yoshio Oishi, the leader of the Rōnin.
 Tadanobu Asano as Lord Yoshinaka Kira, Lord Asano's rival daimyō.
 Rinko Kikuchi as Mizuki the Witch, an odd-eyed sorceress who serves Lord Kira
 Ko Shibasaki as Mika Asano, Lord Asano's daughter and Kai's love interest.
 Arisa Maekawa as Teen Mika
 Min Tanaka as Lord Naganori Asano, the former master of the Rōnin.
 Cary-Hiroyuki Tagawa as Shōgun Tsunayoshi Tokugawa

 Jin Akanishi as Chikara Oishi, Oishi's son.
 Masayoshi Haneda as Yasuno

 Hiroshi Sogabe as Hazama
 Takato Yonemoto as Basho
 Hiroshi Yamada as Hara

 Yorick van Wageningen as Kapitan
 Masayuki Deai as Isogai
 Shu Nakajima as Horibe

 Togo Igawa as Tengu Lord
 Natsuki Kunimoto as Riku
 Gedde Watanabe as Troupe Leader (Kabuki Actor)
 Rick Genest as Foreman
 Ron Bottitta as Narrator

Production

Development
Universal Pictures first announced the film in December 2008, with Keanu Reeves attached to star. Variety then reported that "the film will tell a stylized version of the story, mixing fantasy elements of the sort seen in The Lord of the Rings pics, with gritty battle scenes akin to those in films such as Gladiator." Universal planned to produce the film in 2009 after finding a director and in November of that year, the studio entered talks with Carl Rinsch, who had filmed "visual and stylish" blurbs for brands, to direct the film.

In December 2010, the studio announced that the film would be produced and released in 3D. Between March and April 2011, five Japanese actors were cast alongside Reeves: Hiroyuki Sanada, Tadanobu Asano, Rinko Kikuchi, Kou Shibasaki and Jin Akanishi; according to Variety, Universal chose them in order to make the film's story more authentic rather than choose actors recognizable in the United States. Universal provided Rinsch with an initial production budget of  despite his complete lack of feature film experience, which led to The Hollywood Reporter considering it to be a "large-scale, downright risky" move.

Filming
Origo Film Group contributed to the film. Production moved to Shepperton Studios in the United Kingdom; additional filming in Japan was also planned. Reeves said that scenes were filmed first in the Japanese language in order to familiarize the cast, to which the scenes were filmed again in the English language. The actors' costumes were designed by Penny Rose, who said, "We decided to base it on the culture and what the shapes should be—i.e., everyone's in a kimono—but we've thrown a kind of fashion twist at it. And we've made it full of color, which is quite unusual for me."

Reshoots were done in London during late August 2012, which were delayed by the Olympics and the filming of Reeves' directorial debut Man of Tai Chi. Universal pulled Rinsch from the project during the editing stages in late 2012, with Universal chairwoman Donna Langley taking over the editing process. In addition, the studio added a love scene, extra close-ups and individual lines of dialogue in order to try and boost Reeves' presence in the film, which "significantly added" to the budget of the film.

Music
47 Ronin: Original Motion Picture Soundtrack is the film's soundtrack album of music composed and made by Ilan Eshkeri and was released on December 17, 2013 by Varèse Sarabande.

Soundtrack list

 Oishi's Tale
 Kirin Hunt
 Resentment
 The Witch's Plan
 Ako
 Shogun
 Tournament
 Bewitched
 Assano Seppuku
 Dutch Island Fugue
 Reunited Ronin
 Tengu
 Shrine Ambush
 The Witch's Lie
 Kira's Wedding Quartet
 Palace Battle
 The Witch Dragon
 Return To Ako
 Shogun's Sentence
 Mika and Kai
 Seppuku
 47 Ronin

Release

An endorsement from the cast of Sengoku Basara was held until January 23, 2014, stating that Japanese fans who tweet with the hashtag #RONIN_BASARA could win Sengoku Basara 4 for the PS3 or a 47 Ronin poster signed by the film's cast.

Home media
Universal Pictures Home Entertainment released 47 Ronin on DVD, Blu-ray and Blu-ray 3D on April 1, 2014.

Reception

Box office
The film opened in Japan in the first week of December 2013 where it opened to 753 screens nationwide and grossed an estimated US$1.3 million, opening third behind Lupin the 3rd vs. Detective Conan: The Movie and the third week of the Studio Ghibli film Kaguya-hime no Monogatari (The Tale of Princess Kaguya). Variety called the Japanese debut "troubling", considering the well-known local cast and the fact that the film is loosely based on a famous Japanese tale. The evening tabloid newspaper Nikkan Gendai stated that its dismal performance were "unheard-of numbers" generated by the Japanese distaste for a Hollywood rendition of Chushingura which bore no resemblance to the renowned historical epic. In the United States the film grossed US$20.6 million in its first five days of release, opening in ninth place at the box office. It also grossed US$2.3 million for a fifth-place debut in the United Kingdom. The film was a box office bomb, unable to recover its $175 million production budget.

Critical response
47 Ronin received predominantly negative reviews from film critics, failing to impress Japanese audiences where studio expectations were high. On Rotten Tomatoes, the film holds a 16% approval rating based on 89 reviews, with an average score of 4.2/10. The critical consensus states: "47 Ronin is a surprisingly dull fantasy adventure, one that leaves its talented international cast stranded within one dimensional roles." On Metacritic the film has a score of 28 out of 100 based on 21 critics, indicating "generally unfavorable reviews". Audiences polled by CinemaScore gave the film an average grade of "B+" on an A+ to F scale.

Kirsten Acuña of Business Insider stated that the film flopped for three reasons: First, it opened in December when there is an over-saturation of films for the Christmas season; second, the film took "too long in the vault", having undergone editing and lost momentum; and third, audiences had not been drawn to Reeves as an actor since The Matrix Revolutions (which was released ten years prior) and that he had not yet reestablished his stardom prior to making John Wick.

Accolades

Sequel 

In August 2020, a sequel was announced to be in development. Ron Yuan will serve as director, with John Orlando, Share Stallings and Tim Kwok co-producing. The plot of the film will take place 300 years in the future and will be a mashup of genres including martial arts, horror, action, and science fiction cyber-punk. By April 2021, actress Aimee Garcia and former professional wrestler-turned-author AJ Mendez were writing the sequel. Principal photography took place in Budapest in December 2021. Blade of the 47 Ronin was produced by Universal 1440 Entertainment and distributed by Netflix for release on October 25, 2022.

References

External links
  
 
 
 
 
 
 
 

2013 films
2010s English-language films
2013 3D films
2013 action films
2013 martial arts films
2013 directorial debut films
2010s fantasy action films
American 3D films
American fantasy action films
American martial arts films
2010s Japanese-language films
Films scored by Ilan Eshkeri
Films set in Japan
Films set in the 18th century
Films shot in Budapest
Films shot in Japan
Films shot in London
Samurai films
American sword and sorcery films
Films about shapeshifting
Films shot at Shepperton Studios
Relativity Media films
Universal Pictures films
Films about witchcraft
Films about the Forty-seven Ronin
Films with screenplays by Hossein Amini
Films with screenplays by Chris Morgan
Japan in non-Japanese culture
2010s American films